Levani Botia (born 14 March 1989 in Naitasiri) is a Fijian rugby union footballer. Nicknamed "Demolition Man", plays centre, flanker and wing for La Rochelle and his national team, Fiji.

Career
Botia worked as a prison officer, it was then that he got a chance to play for the Warden's 7's team in a local competition. He never told his wife that he played rugby professionally until she saw him one day on TV playing at the 2011 Pacific Games in New Caledonia.

He did not go to high school as he left school after finishing class eight to focus on his rugby career. He left for Suva after a few years and there he played for the Suva development side before playing for City Eagles. He was spotted one day by former Fiji 7's coach and legend, Waisale Serevi who included him in the sevens team to the 2011 Pacific Games. After returning, he was included in the main sevens team for the 2012–13 IRB Sevens World Series though an injury ruled him out for most of the season but he was included in the Fiji team to the 2013 Rugby World Cup Sevens. Botia also played in the Digicel Cup for his province, Namosi and he even took his side to the semi-final in 2013. He even captained the national 7's team in a few tournaments .

In February 2014, he joined Pro D2 rugby side, La Rochelle.

Fiji national team (15s) 
He made his International debut for the Fiji 15's team against Portugal during the 2013 end-of-year rugby union internationals and he also scored a try on debut. He then played again for Fiji a week later against the Barbarians, a centennial match for Fiji to celebrate 100 years of rugby in Fiji.

He then joined the team a year later when they played France starting at inside centre.

In June 2015, he was included in the Fiji team to play in the 2015 World Rugby Pacific Nations Cup. He set up one of the tries of the year when he regathered a kick and set off on one of his trademark runs and then bumped off 2 Tongan players to set up a try for Henry Seniloli.

He was included in the final 31-member squad to the 2015 Rugby World Cup.

Trademark
Botia is known for his trademark runs and strong tackles and tackle busts.

Career statistics
 Test debut - Portugal v Fiji at Lisbon, Nov 9, 2013
 Last Test - Ireland v Fiji at Dublin, Nov 12, 2022

Honours

Club 
 La Rochelle
European Rugby Champions Cup: 2021–2022

External links
 
 Club Profile
 Fiji Rugby Profile of Metuisela Talebula
 ITS rugby profile

References

1989 births
Living people
Fijian rugby union players
Fiji international rugby union players
Fijian expatriate rugby union players
Expatriate rugby union players in France
Fijian expatriate sportspeople in France
Rugby union wings
Rugby union flankers
Rugby union centres
Male rugby sevens players